List of California State Historic Parks — a division of the California Department of Parks and Recreation, for historic sites in California.

List
Anderson Marsh State Historic Park    
Antelope Valley Indian Museum State Historic Park
Bale Grist Mill State Historic Park    
Benicia Capitol State Historic Park   
Bidwell Mansion State Historic Park
Bodie State Historic Park   
California Citrus State Historic Park    
Chumash Painted Cave State Historic Park   
Colonel Allensworth State Historic Park
Columbia State Historic Park    
El Presidio de Santa Barbara State Historic Park 
Empire Mine State Historic Park   
Folsom Powerhouse State Historic Park 
Fort Humboldt State Historic Park 
Fort Ross State Historic Park  
Fort Tejon State Historic Park  
Governor's Mansion State Historic Park
Hearst San Simeon State Historical Monument   
Indian Grinding Rock State Historic Park
Jack London State Historic Park  
La Purísima Mission State Historic Park   
Leland Stanford Mansion State Historic Park
Los Angeles State Historic Park   
Los Encinos State Historic Park   
Malakoff Diggins State Historic Park    
Marconi Conference Center State Historic Park    
Marshall Gold Discovery State Historic Park    
Monterey State Historic Park   
Old Sacramento State Historic Park   
Old Town San Diego State Historic Park    
Olompali State Historic Park    
Petaluma Adobe State Historic Park   
Pigeon Point Light Station State Historic Park
Pío Pico State Historic Park    
Point Sur State Historic Park   
Railtown 1897 State Historic Park
Robert Louis Stevenson State Park
San Juan Bautista State Historic Park  
San Pasqual Battlefield State Historic Park    
Santa Cruz Mission State Historic Park    
Santa Susana Pass State Historic Park    
Shasta State Historic Park    
Sonoma State Historic Park    
State Indian Museum State Historic Park
Sutter's Fort State Historic Park   
Tomo-Kahni State Historic Park  
Wassama Round House State Historic Park  
Watts Towers of Simon Rodia State Historic Park    
Weaverville Joss House State Historic Park   
Will Rogers State Historic Park    
William B. Ide Adobe State Historic Park   
Woodland Opera House State Historic Park

See also
List of California state parks, which includes this list
List of National Historic Landmarks in California, which overlaps with this list
List of Registered Historic Places in California, which overlaps with this list
List of state beaches in California

External links 
California State Historic Parks (official site)

.
.California State Historic Parks, List
.California State Historic Parks, List
California State Historic Parks, List
California State Historic Parks, List
.California State Historic Parks, List